The second USS Kensington was a steamship in the United States Navy.

Kensington was built at Philadelphia, Pennsylvania,  by J. W. Lynn in 1858 and was purchased by the Union Navy at Boston, Massachusetts, 27 January 1862. She commissioned at Boston Navy Yard on 15 February, Acting Master Frederick Crocker in command.

Service history

Blockading operations
The wooden steamer departed Boston on 24 February 1862 for the Gulf of Mexico, but heavy winds, rough seas, and engine trouble required her to stop at Charleston, South Carolina,  for repairs. While, at Charleston she was of great service to ships of the North Atlantic Squadron furnishing them with fresh water. The supply and water vessel resumed her voyage in April and joined the West Gulf Blockading Squadron at New Orleans, Louisiana, 4 May.

Ordered to the Mississippi 
While passing Ellis Cliffs, the three ships came under fire of Confederate batteries. Their answering salvos silenced the Southern guns enabling the Union force to continue passage to Vicksburg. After placing her charges in position to bombard the cliff side batteries which defended Vicksburg, Kensington remained with Porter's flotilla issuing water and supplies and from time to time assisting sailing ships to change positions.

After dropping down the river in mid-July, the water and supply ship visited blockaders stationed along the Louisiana and Texas coast. The action was broken off when defending troops spiked their guns and evacuated the fort. Though Sabine Pass surrendered the next day, a shortage of troops prevented the Union Navy from occupying the area. Nevertheless, this operation and similar attacks were a constant drain on Southern strength, and compelled the Confederacy to disperse its forces widely.

Capturing Confederate Vessels  
During operations along western Gulf coast in September and October, Kensington captured British blockade running schooners Velocity. Adventure, Dart, and West Florida. She also took Confederate schooners Conchita, Dart, and Mary Ann; sloop Eliza; and steamer Dan.
 
Kensington began her voyage to Pensacola, Florida, with her prizes 13 October, delivering water en route to blockading ships stationed along the coast of Texas. Arriving Pensacola, 24 October, the fighting supply ship began operating from that base, capturing Confederate schooner  Course on 11 November and British schooner Maria the next day.
 
Kensington moved to New Orleans, Louisiana, 26 January 1863 and five months later set sail for New York City for long needed repairs. Back in fighting trim by 1 August 1864, Kensington functioned as a supply vessel for ships of the North Atlantic Blockading Squadron until 30 November. She sailed from Boston as a transport vessel on 7 December visiting Port Royal, Key West, Florida, Mobile, Alabama, Pensacola, and New Orleans. After returning to New York on 11 January 1865, Kensington made two similar voyages to Southern ports.

Decommissioning 
Kensington was decommissioned 5 May 1865. She was sold at public auction at New York to Brown & Co. on 12 July 1865 and redocumented 31 July. Kensington sank after colliding with an unknown sailing vessel at sea on 27 January 1871.

References 

Steamships of the United States Navy
Ships built in Philadelphia
Ships of the Union Navy
American Civil War patrol vessels of the United States
Gunboats of the United States Navy
1858 ships